Sahasram is a 2010 Malayalam film directed by director Dr. Janardhanan, starring Suresh Gopi, Lakshmi Gopalaswamy, Bala,  Sarayu and Sandhya in the lead roles. Later in 2013 the film was dubbed in Tamil as Ruthravathy.

Plot
The film starts with a shooting of an upcoming film in which is an actor Sudheer who is a womanizer. On the shooting of this movie he pushes the actress Yamuna on the waterfall. But she was saved by an art director Vyshakh who was the lover of Yamuna. Vyshakh fights with Sudheer and Yamuna suicides in the waterfall when Vyshakh scolds her. This incident makes Vyshak extremely sad and he becomes a drug addict .

But later, Vyshakh gets a notice from an upcoming movie named Yakshiambalam from his friend Raghupathy who gives from a director for a work Vyshakh agrees this and goes to a Mana for a location and then he calls Dr. Vrinda who knows the story of this house. And then he comes to the same house and he sees the owner and her wife Sridevi and they agrees to shoot the film. But he escapes from the house who a fight between the rivals.

One morning, he gets a call from the man who is the driver of Dr. Vrinda. But he says to the driver that he sees the house owner and his wife but the driver does not believe and Vyshakh goes to the same house where he came when he sees that the house is now in existence. It is revealed that the house was haunted. He goes to the same house at night and drawing the picture of the same persons where he met. When he draws their pictures a spirit of the same women was coming to haunt him but he escapes from there when he hears the same sound of the women.

When the starts shooting of the movie Yakshiambalam on the same location of the house they calls the newly debutante film actress Supriya Vyshakh sees the debutante actress who is a dopplegänger of the same girl. When Vyshakh believes that if she acts in this movie surely she will be dead.

He fights with Sudheer with an exact revenge on him. But later, at night when Sudheer came to rape Supriya. Supriya pushes him and a mask wearing man kills Sudheer and this causes Supriya goes to unconscious.

At the hospital, Supriya comes to consciousness and the police files a witness truth from Supriya. The police come to the shooting location to arrest Vyshakan on suspicion . But, due to the heavy influence of drugs, he gets into a violent fight with the police and the people at the location. This time, a daring and honest police officer SP Vishnu Sahasranamam IPS took the investigation of the murder case of the actor Sudheer. He arrives at the location and arrests Vyshakan . Vyshakan is later admitted to the mental ward in the City Hospital.

Sudheer's Father Sreekanthan is the state home minister and has an exact revenge on Vaishak for killing his son Sudheer. He orders the police officials that Vyshakan should be given death penalty by the court. Vyshakan turns extremely violent at the hospital and advances to attack SP Vishnu. But Vishnu defends him and Vyshakan is given a shock treatment.

Vishnu then begins his investigation into the case. He is assisted by Circle Inspector Ameer and Sub Inspector Joy. The rest of the movie is how Vishnu finds the real perpetrator behind Sudheer's death and also unravels a few mysteries behind the mansion which is being used as the shooting location.

Cast

Soundtrack

The music of Sahasram is given by M. Jayachandran. The lyrics are written by Kaithapram Damodaran Namboothiri.
The film has two songs, performed by K. S. Chitra and Alphose.

References

2010 films
2010s Malayalam-language films
2010 crime thriller films
Indian mystery thriller films
Indian crime thriller films
2010s mystery thriller films
Films scored by M. Jayachandran